Pyramid was a gaming magazine, publishing articles primarily on role-playing games, but including board games, card games, and other sorts of games. It began life in 1993 as a print publication of Steve Jackson Games for its first 30 issues, though it has been published on the Internet since March 1998. Print issues were bimonthly; the first online version published new articles each week; the second online version is monthly. Pyramid is headquartered in Austin, Texas. It replaced Steve Jackson Games' previous magazine Roleplayer.

Pyramid features general gaming articles by freelance authors, as well as Designer's Notes by Steve Jackson Games product developers, industry news, cartoons, and gaming product reviews. Although articles tend to concentrate on Steve Jackson Games products such as GURPS, it has published articles on other games such as d20 System, Talisman, Nobilis, Hero System, and has featured various comic strips and single-panel cartoons (currently Murphy's Rules). Steve Jackson Games also briefly published another online magazine, d20 Weekly for several months using a very similar model to that of Pyramid. However, the venture was not a success, and was eventually folded into a slightly expanded Pyramid.

The online subscription system used for Pyramid also granted access to subscriber forums, a dedicated chat server, and occasional pre-publication playtest material for Steve Jackson Games and other companies' products. In 2008 this was changed: Pyramid became available as a PDF download from e23 (online service), and the subscriber forums have been discontinued. Access to playtest material is contingent on participation in an actual playtest.

In late 2018, it was announced on the Pyramid page of the Steven Jackson Games website that "we are closing down Pyramid magazine later this year. The December 2018 issue will be the final issue of the magazine, and effective immediately, we are no longer accepting subscriptions."

Publication history
Shannon Appelcline noted that Roleplayer magazine ceased publication with issue #30 in 1993, "but only so that Steve Jackson Games could start a new magazine. Pyramid debuted in May 1993. It was an ironic return to the generalist magazine industry—though it also promised to incorporate the SJG material that had once been printed in Autoduel Quarterly and Roleplayer."  Appelcline noted that the magazine covered its own games including Car Wars, but covered GURPS so strongly that "SJG always had problems selling Pyramid as a non-house organ. Contrariwise Car Wars quickly faded away. The new magazine also looked quite nice, with glossy pages and some full color pages—luxuries that Space Gamer had enjoyed only briefly. It soon became entirely color, as SJG's star continued to rise over the next few years."  Appelcline concluded that Steve Jackson Games began "having concerns over the profitability of publishing a generalist magazine. They finished up Pyramids print run with #30 (March/April 1998), and then did something unprecedented: they began publishing 'volume two' of Pyramid as an online, weekly, subscription-based magazine and were able to successfully do so for 10 years."  He also noted that as the company was moving to PDF technology, Steve Jackson Games ended the HTML second volume of Pyramid and reinvented it in 2008 as a PDF-only third volume of Pyramid.

Editors
 Derek Pearcy—Print issues 1–2.
 Jeff Koke—Print issues 3–4.
 Scott Haring—Print issues 5–30. Online edition March 1998 – February 2000.
 S. John Ross—Online edition 1998.
 Steven Marsh—Online edition February 2000 – December 2018.

Awards
 2001: Origins Award Best Professional Game Magazine of 2000
 2004: Origins Award Gamer's Choice: Best Electronic Product of 2003
 2005: Origins Award Best Non Fiction Publication of 2004

List of issues

Volume 1
the printed version, retroactively referred to as Pyramid Classic''':
01: May–June 1993
30: March 1998, same cover art as GURPS Wizards

Volume 2
There are 1877 samples of articles released in it.

Issues:
001: April 1998
558: November 2008

Articles:
1: A Minor Emergency
7: Electronic Gaming News
8: Warehouse 23
91: Autoduel Japan
1002: Suppressed Transmission published 13 August 1999
2630: When Good LARPers Go Bad published 1 March 2002

Volume 3
01: Tools of the Trade - Wizards, November 2008
Superheroes, December 2008
03: Venturing Into the Badlands - Post Apocalypse, January 2009 
04: Magic on the Battlefield, February 2009
05: Horror & Spies, March 2009
06: Space Colony Alpha, April 2009http://www.warehouse23.com/media/SJG37-2606_preview.pdf 
07: Urban Fantasy, May 2009
08: Cliffhangers, June 2009
09: Space Opera, July 2009http://www.warehouse23.com/media/SJG37-2609_preview.pdf 
10: Crime and Grime, August 2009
11: Cinematic Locations, September 2009
12: Tech and Toys, October 2009http://www.warehouse23.com/media/SJG37-2612_preview.pdf 
13: Thaumatology, November 2009http://www.warehouse23.com/media/SJG37-2613_preview.pdf 
14: Martial Arts December 2009
15: Transhuman Space, January 2010http://www.warehouse23.com/media/SJG37-2615_preview.pdf 
16: Historical Exploration, February 2010
17: Modern Exploration, March 2010
18: Space Exploration, April 2010http://www.warehouse23.com/media/SJG37-2618_preview.pdf 
19: Tools of the Trade: Clerics, May 2010
20: Infinite Worlds, June 2010
21: Cyberpunk, July 2010http://www.warehouse23.com/media/SJG37-2621_preview.pdf 
22: Banestorm, August 2010
23: Action Adventures, September 2010
24: Bio-Tech, October 2010http://www.warehouse23.com/media/SJG37-2624_preview.pdf 
25: Epic Magic, November 2010
26, Underwater Adventures, December 2010
27: Monsters in Space, January 2011http://www.warehouse23.com/media/SJG37-2627_preview.pdf 
28: Thaumatology II, February 2011
29: Psionics, March 2011
30: Spaceships, April 2011http://www.warehouse23.com/media/SJG37-2630_preview.pdf 
31: Monster Hunters, May 2011
32: Fears of Days Past, June 2011
33: Low-Tech, July 2011
34: Alternate GURPS, August 2011
35: Aliens, September 2011http://www.warehouse23.com/media/SJG37-2635_preview.pdf 
36: Dungeon Fantasy, October 2011
37: Tech and Toys II, November 2011http://www.warehouse23.com/media/SJG37-2637_preview.pdf 
38: The Power of Myth, December 2011
39: Steampunk, January 2012
40: Vehicles, February 2012http://www.warehouse23.com/media/SJG37-2640_preview.pdf 
41: Fantasy World Building, March 2012
42: Noir, April 2012
43: Thaumatology III, May 2012
44: Alternate GURPS II, June 2012
45: Monsters, July 2012
46: Weird Science, August 2012http://www.warehouse23.com/media/SJG37-2646_preview.pdf 
47: The Rogue's Life, September 2012
48: Secret Magic, October 2012
49: World-Hopping, November 2012http://www.warehouse23.com/media/SJG37-2649_preview.pdf 
50: Dungeon Fantasy II, December 2012
51: Tech and Toys III, January 2013http://www.warehouse23.com/media/SJG37-2651_preview.pdf 
52: Low-Tech II, February 2012
53: Action, March 2012
54: Social Engineering, April 2013http://www.warehouse23.com/media/SJG37-2654_preview.pdf 
55: Military Sci-Fi, May 2013http://www.warehouse23.com/media/SJG37-2655_preview.pdf 
56: Prehistory, June 2013
57: Gunplay, July 2013
58: Urban Fantasy II, August 2013
59: Conspiracies, September 2013
60: Dungeon Fantasy III, October 2013
61: Way of the Warrior, November 2013
62: Transhuman Space II, December 2013http://www.warehouse23.com/media/SJG37-2662_preview.pdf 
63: Infinite Worlds II, January 2014
64: Pirates and Swashbucklers, February 2014
65: Alternate GURPS III, March 2014http://www.warehouse23.com/media/SJG37-2665_preview.pdf 
66: The Laws of Magic, April 2014http://www.warehouse23.com/media/SJG37-2666_preview.pdf 
67: Tools of the Trade: Villains, May 2014
68: Natural Magic, June 2014
69: Psionics II, July 2014
70: Fourth Edition Festival, August 2014
71: Spaceships II, September 2014http://www.warehouse23.com/media/SJG37-2671_preview.pdf 
72: Alternate Dungeons, October 2014
73: Monster Hunters II, November 2014
74: Wild West, December 2014
75: Hero's Jackpot, January 2015http://www.warehouse23.com/media/SJG37-2675_preview.pdf 
76: Dungeon Fantasy IV, February 2014
77: Combat, March 2015http://www.warehouse23.com/media/SJG37-2677_preview.pdf 
78: Unleash Your Soul, April 2014
79: Space Atlas, May 2015http://www.warehouse23.com/media/SJG37-2679_preview.pdf 
80: Fantasy Threats, June 2015
81: Horrific Creations, July 2015
82: Magical Creations, August 2015
83: Alternate GURPS IV, September 2015
84: Perspectives, October 2015http://www.warehouse23.com/media/SJG37-2684_preview.pdf 
85: Cutting Edge, November 2015http://www.warehouse23.com/media/SJG37-2685_preview.pdf 
86: Organizations, December 2015
87: Low-Tech III, January 2016
88: The End Is Nigh, February 2016http://www.warehouse23.com/media/SJG37-2688_preview.pdf 
89: Alternate Dungeons II, March 2016
90: After the End, April 2016
91: Thaumatology IV, May 2016
92: Zombies, June 2016
93: Cops and Lawyers, July 2016
94: Spaceships III, August 2016
95: Overland Adventures, September 2016
96: Tech and Toys IV, October 2016
97: Strange Powers, November 2016
98: Welcome to Dungeon Fantasy, December 2016
99: Death and Beyond, January 2017
100: Pyramid Secrets, February 2017
101: Humor, March 2017
102: Epic, April 2017
103: Setbacks, May 2017
104: Dungeon Fantasy Roleplaying Game, June 2017
105: Cinematic Magic, July 2017
106: Dungeon Fantasy Roleplaying Game II, August 2017
107: Monster Hunters III, September 2017
108: Dungeon Fantasy Roleplaying Game II, October 2017
109: Thaumatology V, November 2017
110: Deep Space, December 2017
111: Combat II, January 2018
112: Action II, February 2018
113: Dungeon Fantasies, March 2018
114: Mind Over Magic, April 2018
115: Technomancer, May 2018
116: Locations, June 2018
117: Hot Spots, July 2018
118: Dungeon Trips, August 2018
119: After the End II, September 2018
120: Alternate GURPS V, October 2018
121: Travels and Tribulations, November 2018
122: All Good Things, December 2018

ReviewsDragon'' #212 (December 1994) p94

References

External links
 

Defunct magazines published in the United States
Game magazines
 
Magazines established in 1993
Magazines disestablished in 2018
Magazines published in Austin, Texas
Online magazines with defunct print editions
Origins Award winners
Online magazines published in the United States
Role-playing game magazines